Kettly Noël (born in Port-au-Prince in 1966) is a Haitian dancer, choreographer and actress. Her first choreographed piece, Nanlakou, premiered in 1995. Tichèlbe (2002) won both the Rencontres chorégraphiques d’Afrique et d’océan Indien and RFI Danse prizes. She's the founder and artistic director of the Donko Senko dance studio, Dense Bamako Danse festival, both in Mali, and the Port-au-Prince Art Performance (PAPAP) festival in Haiti. Noël was also noted for her performance in the role of Zabou in Abderrahmane Sissako's 2014 film Timbuktu.

Works
1995: Nanlakou
2002: Tichèlbè 
2017: Panser la planète 
2017: Zombification and Errance, documenta 14 in Athens, Greece and Kassel, Germany

Prizes
 Rencontres chorégraphiques d’Afrique et d’océan Indien, 2003
 RFI Danse, 2003
 Hiroshima Prize, 2014

References

1966 births
Haitian women choreographers
Women choreographers
Haitian dancers
Living people